The order of precedence of the European Union is the protocol hierarchy in which its offices and dignitaries are listed according to their rank in the European Union. Article 13 of the Treaty on European Union (Treaty of Lisbon), entered into force on 1 December 2009, sets the EU's current order of precedence among the EU institutions and bodies. The EU administrative structure further has interinstitutional services, decentralised organisations (agencies), executive agencies, Euratom agencies and bodies, and other EU organisations not included in the order of precedence.

The European Parliament is formally at the top of protocol, followed by the European Council, the Council of the European Union and the European Commission. However, some see the president of the commission as "the closest thing the EU has to a head of government".

Institutions and bodies

Institutions

External policy body

Consultative bodies

Other bodies

Dignitaries

External representation 
The protocol for third countries assigns head of state status to the president of the council and head of government status to the president of the commission.

See also
Sofagate

References

Order of precedence
European Union